The Williams FJ33 is an American family of turbofan jet engines intended for use in very light jet aircraft. The FJ33 is a scaled-down version of the FJ44 engine. The FJ33-5A is the latest version certified in June 2016.

Design
Engine configuration is a single stage fan, with booster stage, driven by a two-stage LP turbine, supercharging a centrifugal HP compressor, driven by a single stage HP turbine. An annular combustor is featured.

Specific fuel consumption at  thrust (SLS, ISA) is understood to be .

Variants
 FJ33-1
 FJ33-2
 FJ33-3
 FJ33-4-A11
 FJ33-4
 FJ33-4-17M
 FJ33-4-18M
 FJ33-4A-19
 FJ33-5A
 Jahesh-700
Iranian Reverse engineered variant serving as high endurance UAV powerplant.

Applications
 Adam A700
 ATG Javelin
 Cirrus Vision SF50
 Diamond D-Jet
 Epic Elite
 Flaris LAR01
 Spectrum S-33 Independence
 Sport Jet II
 Eclipse 700

Specifications (FJ33-5A)

See also

References

External links

 Williams Product Information FJ33
 List of jets designed to use FJ33

Medium-bypass turbofan engines
2000s turbofan engines
FJ33
Centrifugal-flow turbojet engines